CSL Group Limited encompasses CSL Security and CSL Health operating in the United Kingdom, Ireland, the Netherlands and Sweden.

CSL began as a supplier of dual signalling burglar alarms.  CSL pioneered the use of dual signalling, wherein the alarm system communicates with a monitoring station using both wired (telephone or internet) and wireless (GPRS/GSM) communications for increased reliability. CSL is among the UK's suppliers of signalling for intruder alarms, managing the signalling of residential and commercial installations.

History 
CSL was formed in 1996 by Chris Brookes and Simon Banks.  In 2000, CSL became a Vodafone service provider and business partner. In 2006 a management buyout by Octopus Investments was successfully completed, allowing CSL to fund further product development including their Gemini Platform. During this process, Simon Banks and Phil Hollett – previously CEO and now Director – bought out co-founder Chris Brookes.

In January 2012, CSL was acquired by Bowmark Capital for £32M. The two companies plan to work together on the next stage of CSL's development. Simon Banks and Phil Hollett continue to direct the company with the support of Bowmark. Following Bowmark's investment in 2011, CSL has invested significantly in its core Fire & Security customer base.

In August 2016, CSL was acquired by Norland Capital, ICONIQ Capital and RIT Capital Partners.

In April 2017, CSL announced its acquisition of Emizon Networks Ltd. The aim of the acquisition is to enhance CSL's existing service with greater IP capability, as well as underpinning CSL's international growth ambitions.

In December 2017, CSL announced its acquisition of IQIP, a European provider of IP based security and telecommunication services.

Since January 2020, SCM Group is supplying SIM-cards for security systems' hubs of Ajax Systems, sold in the UK.

CSL Group Limited 
CSL Group is an international M2M investment group, that consists of CSL Security and CSL Health. The Group currently operates in the United Kingdom, the Republic of Ireland and Sweden. CSL Security pioneered the move from wired to wireless technology in the electronic security industry and is now the established market leader. CSL Health offer wireless technology to the telecare market.

Operations 
CSL operate from their West London headquarters with the logistics department based in Mountain Ash in South Wales and regional sales offices.

Employees 
As well as the national sales team, CSL also have their marketing, technical, IT and finance departments at their London head office. Their manufacturing and distribution department is based in South Wales whilst CSL also have a telemarketing team based in Nottingham.

References

Fire detection and alarm companies